One-Hit Wonders is a television series airing on VH1 featuring artists who were unable to get a big break into popular music. The series began airing on July 29, 2002. Originally hosted by KROQ/Los Angeles DJ Jed the Fish, his central point was that it's difficult enough for artists to have one hit, and that the real wonder is artists who continue to hit.

External links

2002 American television series debuts
2000s American music television series
2010s American music television series
2020s American music television series
2000s American documentary television series
2010s American documentary television series
2020s American documentary television series
VH1 music shows